The Valeways Millennium Heritage Trail is a waymarked long distance footpath in the Vale of Glamorgan, Wales.

Distance 

The route, including spurs, is 111 kilometres (69 mi) long.

Route 

The meandering circular route runs through the Vale of Glamorgan by way of Peterston-super-Ely, Barry, Cowbridge, Llantwit Major, St Brides Major and Llanharry, with spurs to Ewenny Priory and St. Fagans.

The terrain is varied and includes coastal paths on the Heritage Coast, pasture land in the Vale, and industrial archaeology sites, as well as prehistoric sites such as Tinkinswood and the St Lythans burial chambers.

The whole route is close to Cardiff.

External links

The Millennium Heritage Trail website
Photos of the Valeways Millennium Heritage Trail on geograph.org.uk

Recreational walks in Wales
Long-distance footpaths in Wales